Tower at 1301 Gervais is a high-rise office building in Columbia, South Carolina, and the tallest building in the city not located along the Main Street corridor. Built in 1973, the tower has dark glazing with anodized aluminum columns to give it a dark, uniform-colored appearance. The top floor of the tower holds a private club with views of the city. It was originally constructed for Bankers Trust as their headquarters. It was the tallest building in the city at its completion until the Palmetto Center was topped out on January 23, 1983.

In 2020, the Tower at 1301 Gervais was identified as having an employer who employed an individual who tested positive for Covid-19.

References

See also
John Henry Devereux
St. Matthew's German Evangelical Lutheran Church
List of tallest buildings in Columbia, South Carolina

Buildings and structures in Columbia, South Carolina
Skyscrapers in South Carolina
Skyscraper office buildings in South Carolina
Office buildings completed in 1973